Miltonia flava is a species of orchid endemic to Brazil (Rio de Janeiro).

References

External links 

flava
Endemic orchids of Brazil
Orchids of Rio de Janeiro (state)
Flora of the Atlantic Forest